Vlatades Monastery or Vlatadon Monastery is a monastery in Ano Poli, Thessaloniki, Greece. Built in the 14th century during the late era of the Byzantine Empire, it is a UNESCO World Heritage Site along with 14 other Paleochristian and Byzantine monuments of Thessaloniki because of its Byzantine architecture and importance of Thessaloniki during early and medieval Christianity.

References

Greek Orthodox monasteries in Greece
Byzantine architecture in Thessaloniki
14th-century architecture in Greece
Christian monasteries established in the 14th century
World Heritage Sites in Greece